Scardia is a genus of the fungus moth family 
(Tineidae). Therein, it belongs to the subfamily Scardiinae, of which it is the type genus. Several of the species placed here in earlier times have been moved to other genera of the subfamily, e.g. Amorophaga, Montescardia, and Morophaga.

Species 
The species placed in Scardia are:
 Scardia alleni Robinson, 1986
 Scardia amurensis Zagulajev, 1965
 Scardia anatomella Grote, 1881 (= S. fiskeella)
 Scardia assamensis Robinson, 1986
 Scardia boletella (Fabricius, 1794) (= S. boleti, S. polypori, S. relicta)
 Scardia caucasica Zagulajev, 1965
 Scardia isthmiella Busck, 1914 (tentatively placed here)
 Scardia pharetrodes Meyrick, 1934 (tentatively placed here)
 Scardia tholerodes Meyrick, 1894 (tentatively placed here)

Synonyms
Junior synonyms of Scardia are:
 Agarica Sodoffsky 1837
 Duomitella Kozhantschikov 1923
 Fernaldia Grote 1881

Footnotes

References
  (2009): Scardia. Version 2.1, 2009-DEC-22. Retrieved 2010-MAY-02.
  (2004): Butterflies and Moths of the World, Generic Names and their Type-species – Scardia. Version of 2004-NOV-05. Retrieved 2010-MAY-05.
  [2010]: Global Taxonomic Database of Tineidae (Lepidoptera). Retrieved 2010-MAY-05.
  (2009): Markku Savela's Lepidoptera and some other life forms – Scardia. Version of 2009-AUG-07. Retrieved 2010-MAY-03.

Scardiinae
Tineidae genera